Kulina is a village in Vinni Parish, Lääne-Viru County, in northeastern Estonia.

Philologist Nikolai Anderson (1845–1905) was born in Kulina.

References

 

Villages in Lääne-Viru County